Gernot Reinstadler (24 August 1970 – 19 January 1991) was an Austrian ski racer. He was regarded as among the most promising young talents of the Austrian downhill team of the early 1990s. He died in 1991 after a crash that caused the cancellation of a race.

Death
During training for the Lauberhorn race, while entering the finish S (German: Ziel-S), Reinstadler lost control and crashed into safety nets at full speed, where one of his skis became trapped. Reinstadler suffered a significant pelvic fracture and severe internal injuries and bleeding. He died later the same night at a hospital in Interlaken, after undergoing several blood transfusions.

Following Reinstadler's death, the 1991 Lauberhorn race was cancelled. As a result of this incident, safety measures were improved — the holes in safety nets were made smaller so that ski tips could no longer become so easily entangled in them upon impact.

References

External links
 Der schlimmste Tag in der Geschichte des Lauberhornrennens

Austrian male alpine skiers
1970 births
1991 deaths
Filmed deaths in sports
Skiing deaths
Sport deaths in Switzerland